The Sun River (also called the Medicine River) is a tributary of the Missouri River in the Great Plains, approximately 130 mi (209 km) long, in Montana in the United States.

It rises in the Rocky Mountains in two forks, the North Fork and South Fork, which join in the Flathead National Forest above Gibson Reservoir along the county line between Teton and Lewis and Clark counties. It flows E, SE, and E away from the mountains, past Simms, Sun River, and Vaughn and joins the Missouri at Great Falls.

The water of the river is used extensively for irrigation, through the Sun River Project of the United States Bureau of Reclamation. The irrigation area covers approximately 92,000 acres (372 km2).

The North Fork of the Sun River begins high up in the Bob Marshall Wilderness and flows generally Southward for about  until it meets up with the South Fork of the Sun River.  Almost immediately the two forks flow into Gibson Reservoir, impounded by Gibson Dam.  From when the water leaves the reservoir until it meets the Missouri River in Great Falls, the flowage is known as the Sun River.

The Sun is a Class I river from Gibson Dam to its confluence with the Missouri River for public access for recreational purposes.

History
A sign located 3 miles south of Great Falls gives information on the history of the Sun River.
This river was called "The Medicine" by the Indians.  On the return trip from the coast Capt. Lewis of the Lewis & Clark Expedition struck this river approximately 50 miles west of here.  He followed it down to the Missouri passing near this point July 11, 1806.  In his journal under that date he said:
"when I arrived in sight of the white-bear Islands the missouri bottoms on both sides of the river were crowded with buffaloe  I sincerely believe that there were not less than 10 thousand buffaloe within a circle of 2 miles around that place"

The City of Great Falls covers a portion of the plain across which the Expedition made their difficult 18 mile portage around the falls of the Missouri in June 1805

See also

List of rivers of Montana
Montana Stream Access Law

Notes

External links
EPA: Sun River Watershed
Sun River Information

Rivers of Montana
Tributaries of the Missouri River
Bodies of water of Teton County, Montana
Rivers of Cascade County, Montana
Rivers of Lewis and Clark County, Montana